These are the official results of the Men's Individual Pursuit at the 1996 Summer Olympics in Atlanta, United States.

Medalists

Results

Qualifying round

Quarter-finals

Semi-finals

Final

References

External links
IOC web site
Union cycliste internationale web site
Official Olympic Report found at http://www.la84.org/sports-library-digital-collection/

Cycling at the 1996 Summer Olympics
Cycling at the Summer Olympics – Men's individual pursuit
Track cycling at the 1996 Summer Olympics
Men's events at the 1996 Summer Olympics